Robakowo may refer to the following places:
Robakowo, Greater Poland Voivodeship (west-central Poland)
Robakowo, Kuyavian-Pomeranian Voivodeship (north-central Poland)
Robakowo, Pomeranian Voivodeship (north Poland)